Black Myth: Wukong (黑神话：悟空) is an upcoming action role-playing game by Chinese indie developer Game Science, based on the classical 16th-century Chinese novel Journey to the West.

Gameplay
The game has been described as Souls-like. The player controls a monkey based on Sun Wukong, referred to in the game as "the Destined One" (天命人), to fight through an assortment of enemies. The player also has the ability to transform into a flying insect or a giant monster.

Soundtrack 
The game has been authorized by CCTV to use its theme song from the 1986 TV series Journey to the West.

Marketing
On August 20, 2020, the developer uploaded a 13-minute pre-alpha gameplay video. Within one day, the video had nearly 2 million views on YouTube and 10 million views on bilibili. On February 8, 2021, in celebration of the year of the Ox, Game Science released a 3-minute gameplay trailer, which showed the game's enemies, bosses, areas, and spells.

On August 19, 2021, Game Science released a 12 minute gameplay trailer, which revealed that the game was moved to Unreal Engine 5.

Release
In a 2020 interview with IGN China, Game Science said they planned to release Black Myth: Wukong by 2023. The developer aims to release the game for PC as well as mainstream consoles. The game will be sold as a one-time purchase with possible DLCs. However, in January 2023, Game Science released a short video indicating that the game will be officially released in the summer of 2024.

Controversy
After the release of pre-alpha gameplay video in August 2020, studio head and CEO Feng Ji made 3 sexually charged comments regarding video's popularity on Weibo. Some Chinese internet users who were offended by these comments uncovered that Game Science, in 2015, used explicit graphics and suggestive text in some of its job advertisements. As a result female video game players called for changes to the male-dominated culture of gaming in China.

References

External links
 Pre-alpha gameplay video
  Official website of Black Myth: Wukong
  Official website of Game Science studio

Upcoming video games scheduled for 2024
Action role-playing video games
Fantasy video games
Indie video games
Journey to the West
Unreal Engine games
Soulslike video games
Works based on Journey to the West
Video games about insects
Video games about primates
Video games developed in China
Video games set in China
Video games based on Chinese mythology
Windows games